Ralf de la Hogh (fl. 1384–1395) of Newcastle-under-Lyme, Staffordshire, was an English politician.

He was a Member (MP) of the Parliament of England for Newcastle-under-Lyme in April 1384, 1385, 1386, 1391, 1393 and 1395.

References

Year of birth missing
Year of death missing
English MPs April 1384
Members of the Parliament of England for Newcastle-under-Lyme
English MPs 1385
English MPs 1386
English MPs 1391
English MPs 1393
English MPs 1395